Presidential dollar coins (authorized by ) are a series of United States dollar coins with engravings of relief portraits of U.S. presidents on the obverse and the Statue of Liberty (Liberty Enlightening the World) on the reverse.

From 2007 to 2011, Presidential dollar coins were minted for circulation in large numbers, resulting in a large stockpile of unused $1 coins. From 2012 to 2016, new coins in the series were minted only for collectors.  A new coin was released on December 4, 2020, to honor George H. W. Bush, who died after the original program ended.

Legislative history
, the Presidential $1 Coin Act of 2005, was introduced on May 17, 2005, by Senator John E. Sununu with over 70 co-sponsors. It was reported favorably out of the U.S. Senate Committee on Banking, Housing, and Urban Affairs without amendment on July 29, 2005. The Senate passed it with a technical amendment, by unanimous consent on November 18, 2005.  The House of Representatives passed it (291-113) on December 13, 2005 (a similar bill, H.R. 902, had previously passed in the House, but it was the Senate bill which was passed by both chambers).  The enrolled bill was presented to president George W. Bush on December 15, 2005, and he signed it into law on December 22, 2005.

Program details
The program began on January 1, 2007, and like the 50 State quarters program, was not scheduled to end until every eligible subject was honored.  The program was to issue coins featuring each of four presidents per year on the obverse, issuing one for three months before moving on to the next president in chronological order by term in office.  To be eligible, a president must have been deceased for at least two years prior to the time of minting. The United States Mint called it the Presidential $1 Coin Program.

The reverse of the coins bears the Statue of Liberty, the inscription "$1" and the inscription "United States of America" in all caps, in the font ITC Benguiat. Inscribed along the edge of the coin is the year of minting or issuance of the coin, the mint mark, 13 stars, and also the legend  in the following arrangement: ; before 2009, In God We Trust was also part of the edge lettering. The legend "Liberty" is absent from the coin altogether, since the decision was made that the image of the Statue of Liberty on the reverse of the coin was sufficient to convey the message of liberty. The text of the act does not specify the color of the coins, but per the U.S. Mint "the specifications will be identical to those used for the current Golden dollar". The George Washington $1 coin was first available to the public on February 15, 2007, in honor of Presidents' Day, which was observed on February 19.

This marked the first time since the St. Gaudens Double Eagle (1907–1933) that the United States had issued a coin with edge lettering for circulation. Edge-lettered coins date back to the 1790s.  The process was started to discourage the shaving of gold coin edges, a practice which was used to cheat payees. In December 2007, Congress passed , moving "In God We Trust" to either the obverse or reverse of the coins.
This is the same bill that created a program that included quarters for Washington, D.C., Puerto Rico, Northern Mariana Islands, Guam, the U.S. Virgin Islands, and American Samoa.

The act had been introduced because of the failure of the Sacagawea $1 coin to gain widespread circulation in the United States.  The act sympathized with the need of the nation's private sector for a $1 coin, and expected that the appeal of changing the design would increase the public demand for new coins (as the public generally responded well to the State Quarter program).  The program was also intended to help educate the public about the nation's presidents and their history. In case the coins did not catch on with the general public, then the Mint hoped that collectors would be as interested in the dollars as they were with the State Quarters, which generated about $6.3 billion in seigniorage (i.e.,  the difference between the face value of the coins and the cost to produce them) between January 1999 and December 2008.

Unlike the State Quarter program and the Westward Journey nickel series, which suspended the issuance of the current design during those programs, the act directed the Mint to continue to issue Sacagawea dollar coins during the Presidential series. The law states that at least one in three issued dollars must be a Sacagawea dollar.  Furthermore, the Sacagawea design is required to continue after the Presidential Coin program ends. These requirements were added at the behest of the North Dakota congressional delegation to ensure that Sacagawea, whom North Dakotans consider to be one of their own, ultimately remains on the dollar coin.

However, Federal Reserve officials indicated to Congress that "if the Presidential $1 Coin Program does not stimulate substantial transactional demand for dollar coins, the requirement that the Mint nonetheless produce Sacagawea dollars would result in costs to the taxpayer without any offsetting benefits."  In that event, the Federal Reserve indicated that it would "strongly recommend that Congress reassess the one-third requirement." The one-third requirement was later changed to one-fifth by the Native American $1 Coin Act, passed on September 20, 2007.

Previous versions of the act called for removing from circulation dollar coins issued before the Sacagawea dollar, most notably the Susan B. Anthony dollar, but the version of the act which became law merely directs the Secretary of the Treasury to study the matter and report back to Congress.  The act required federal government agencies (including the United States Postal Service), businesses operating on federal property, and federally funded transit systems to accept and dispense dollar coins by January 2008, and to post signs indicating that they do so.

Minting errors 
On March 8, 2007, the United States Mint announced, that on February 15, 2007, an unknown number of George Washington Presidential $1 coins were released into circulation without their edge inscriptions (the U.S. mottos, "In God We Trust" and "", the coin's mint mark, and its year of issuance; i.e. (where  is either  or )). Ron Guth, of the Professional Coin Grading Service, estimated at least 50,000 coins were released without the edge inscriptions. Because one of the inscriptions missing from the coins is the motto "In God we trust", some articles on the subject have referred to them as "Godless dollars". Fake "Godless dollars" have been produced with the edge lettering filed off.

Also, John Adams Presidential dollars have been discovered with plain edges. They are fewer in quantity than George Washington plain-edge dollars, making them rarer, thus more expensive. A more frequently encountered edge lettering error for the John Adams dollar is a coin with doubled edge lettering. This error occurs when a coin passes through the edge lettering machine twice. Most examples of the doubled-edge-letter John Adams dollar are from the Philadelphia Mint (Denver Mint issues are comparatively scarce). They are seen in two varieties: 1) with both edge lettering inscriptions reading in the same direction, called "overlapped", and 2) with the two inscriptions running in opposite directions—i.e., inverted or upside-down relative to one another—called "inverted".

In early March 2007, a Colorado couple found a dollar coin which had not been struck with a die pair (missing the portrait of the president and the Statue of Liberty), but with edge lettering on the otherwise-blank planchet.

Some of the coins have the words on the rim struck upside down (president face up). These are not minting errors, but rather a variation created by the minting process. Such upside-down coins have been sold on auction websites like eBay and Amazon for greater than their face value, though they represent roughly 50% of the minted population.

Stockpile and suspension of production

By 2011, 1.4 billion uncirculated $1 coins were stockpiled, which, if laid flat, could reach from Los Angeles to Chicago. By 2016, this number might have reached two billion if the minting had continued unchanged.

Rep. Jackie Speier of California circulated a "Dear Colleague" letter recommending that the U.S. not produce any dollar coins. She was planning to introduce legislation calling for the immediate halting of all dollar coin programs.

The United States Government Accountability Office has stated that discontinuing the dollar bill in favor of the dollar coin would save the U.S. government about $5.5 billion over 30 years.

On December 13, 2011, Vice President Joe Biden and Treasury Secretary Timothy Geithner announced that the minting of Presidential $1 coins for circulation would be suspended. Future entries in the program, beginning with those of Chester A. Arthur, would be issued in reduced quantities, only for collectors.

The program's end and continuation
The act specifies that for a former president to be honored, they must have been deceased for at least two years before issue. Hence, former presidents George H. W. Bush, Jimmy Carter, Bill Clinton, George W. Bush, and then-current president Barack Obama were ineligible to have a dollar coin issued in their honor when the series ended in 2016, after honoring Ronald Reagan, the last president who was eligible.

Since the program has terminated, producing coins for those presidents not yet honored would require another Act of Congress. On February 12, 2019, Senator John Cornyn introduced a bill to authorize a Presidential dollar honoring George H. W. Bush and an accompanying First Spouse gold coin for Barbara Bush, which was signed into law by President Donald Trump on January 28, 2020.

Collecting
Despite not seeing widespread use in circulation, the series has seen a few lower-mintage issues, mostly in specially marketed sets. Reverse Proof issues were made for the coins depicting Harry S. Truman, Dwight D. Eisenhower, John F. Kennedy, Lyndon B. Johnson, Ronald Reagan and George H. W. Bush between 2015 and 2020. These issues had mintages between 16,000 and 48,000, depending on the issue.

Coin details
Dollar coins were issued bearing the likenesses of presidents, as follows:

First Spouse program

The United States has honored the spouses of each of the presidents honored by the Presidential $1 Coin Act by issuing half-ounce $10 gold coins featuring their images, in the order they served as first spouse, beginning in 2007.  To date, all first spouses have been women (often called first ladies), but the law uses the term first spouse.

The obverse of these coins feature portraits of the nation's first spouses, their names, the dates and order of their terms as first spouse, as well as the year of minting or issuance, and the words "In God We Trust" and "Liberty".  The United States Mint issued the first spouse gold coins on the same schedule as the Presidential $1 coins issued honoring the presidents.  Each coin has a unique reverse design featuring an image emblematic of that spouse's life and work, as well as the words "The United States of America", "E Pluribus Unum", "$10", "1/2 oz.", and ".9999 Fine Gold".

When a president served unmarried, as four presidents did, a gold coin was issued bearing an obverse image emblematic of Liberty as depicted on a circulating coin of that era, and bearing a reverse image emblematic of themes of that president.  One exception is the coin depicting suffragist Alice Paul which represents the era of the Chester A. Arthur presidency, as Arthur was a widower.

The act, as written, explicitly states that the First Spouse coins are to be released at the same time as their respective $1 Presidential coins. Because the act links a first spouse's eligibility for a coin to that of the presidential spouse, it means that a living first spouse could have appeared on a coin; actually this did not happen, though Nancy Reagan died only a few months before the release of her coin.

The United States Mint launched these coins officially at 12 pm EDT on June 19, 2007.
They provided two versions of the coin: a proof version for $429.95 and an uncirculated version for $410.95.

The United States Mint also produces and makes available to the public bronze medal duplicates of the First Spouse gold coins which are not legal tender. In February 2009 Coin World reported that some 2007 Abigail Adams medals were struck using the reverse from the 2008 Louisa Adams medal. These pieces, called mules, were contained within the 2007 First Spouse medal set.

Although the First Spouse program ended in 2016, it was continued in 2020 to honor Barbara Bush.

A full listing of the coins is:

* Due to volatility in the gold market, the U.S. Mint lowered the price to $549.95 on November 12, 2008, to more accurately reflect the current spot price of gold. This however constantly changed as the price of gold changed. The mint used pricing range tables to adjust pricing of gold coin: 2016 Pricing Grid

† Chester A. Arthur's wife Ellen died before he succeeded to the presidency.  Since there was no First Lady during his presidency, the act explicitly states that Alice Paul, who was born during his term, would appear on this coin.  Since Paul was never First Lady, the coin does not have a served date.

Other provisions
The act also has two other provisions, for the following:
 Issuance of a $50 bullion coin reproducing the 1913 buffalo nickel designed by James Earle Fraser. See American Buffalo (coin)
 Redesign of the reverse of the Lincoln cent in 2009 to show four different scenes from Abraham Lincoln's life in honor of the bicentennial of his birth. These four scenes include:
 his birth and early childhood in Kentucky
 his formative years in Indiana
 his professional life in Illinois
 his presidency in Washington, D.C.

In 2009, numismatic cents that have the metallic copper content of cents minted in 1909 were issued for collectors.

Since 2010, another redesigned reverse for the Lincoln cent is being minted; this "shall bear an image emblematic of President Lincoln's preservation of the United States of America as a single and united country", and replaced the Lincoln Memorial reverse in use from 1959 to 2008.

See also 

 List of presidents of the United States on currency
 American Innovation dollars
 50 State quarters
 America the Beautiful quarters
 District of Columbia and United States Territories quarters
 Westward Journey nickel series
 Sacagawea dollar
 United States Bicentennial coinage

References

External links

 U.S. Mint Presidential $1 Coin Act page
 U.S. Mint First Spouse Program page
 Images of the Presidential $1 coins
 Complete text of the Act at Wikisource
 Senate Bill 1047  at Thomas.loc.gov.
 Full Text (PDF) at from the United States Government Printing Office
 Report by the Congressional Budget Office on the cost of H.R. 902 (the companion to S. 1047), which includes information on seigniorage for the State Quarter program.  April 12, 2005
 Anderson, Gordon T. "Congress tries again for a dollar coin". CNN/Money. April 28, 2005
 Press release, Nov. 21, 2005: Legislation to Redesign Lincoln Penny Passes Senate; Creates Presidential $1 Coin Program Similar to 50 State Quarters Program

2005 in American law
Currencies introduced in 2007
United States federal currency legislation
United States dollar coins
109th United States Congress
Sculptures of presidents of the United States
Circulating commemorative coins of the United States
Goddess of Liberty on coins
Statue of Liberty